Harry Spencer Chichester, 2nd Baron Templemore DL, JP (14 June 1821 – 10 June 1906), styled The Honourable Harry Chichester between 1831 and 1837, was an Anglo-Irish peer.

Career
Chichester was the eldest son of Arthur Chichester, 1st Baron Templemore and Lady Augusta Paget, daughter of Field Marshal Henry Paget, 1st Marquess of Anglesey. He was educated at Eton and Christ Church, Oxford. He succeeded in the barony on the death of his father on 26 September 1837.

During his military service he gained the rank of Honorary Colonel for the 3rd Battalion, Royal Irish Regiment. He served as a deputy lieutenant of County Wexford and was also a justice of the peace for that county.

Personal life
Lord Templemore married firstly his first cousin once removed, Laura Caroline Jane Paget, daughter of Sir Arthur Paget and Lady Augusta Fane, on 3 August 1842. She was the first cousin of his mother Augusta, Baroness Templemore. They had two children: Arthur Henry Chichester, 3rd Baron Templemore and the Honourable Flora Augusta Chichester (1856–1974), who died unmarried. In the 1850s, they lived at 2 Upper Brook Street, Mayfair.

After his first wife's death in December 1871 he married secondly Lady Victoria Elizabeth Ashley, daughter of Anthony Ashley-Cooper, 7th Earl of Shaftesbury and Lady Emily Caroline Catherine Frances Cowper, on 8 January 1873 at St George's, Hanover Square, London. They had one daughter, the Honourable Hilda Caroline Chichester (1875–1961), wife of Sir Victor George Corkran.

Lord Templemore died in June 1906, aged 84, and was succeeded by his only son, Arthur. The widowed Lady Templemore lived at 9 Grosvenor Street, Mayfair. She died in February 1927.

References

External links

1821 births
1906 deaths
People educated at Eton College
Alumni of Christ Church, Oxford
Barons in the Peerage of the United Kingdom
Eldest sons of British hereditary barons
Harry
Grenadier Guards officers